Mera Punjab is a 1940 Indian film directed by Krishna Dev Mehra. It stars Haider Bandi.

References

External links
 

1940 films
Punjabi-language Indian films
Punjabi-language Pakistani films
1940s Punjabi-language films
Indian black-and-white films